Elizabeth Johnston may refer to:

Elizabeth Johnston (dressmaker) (?-?), the official royal dressmaker of queen Adelaide and queen Victoria
Elizabeth Bryant Johnston, (1833–1907) American historian
Elizabeth Parr-Johnston (born 1939), married name Elizabeth Johnston, economist and advisor
Elizabeth Johnston Patterson (1939–2018), née Elizabeth Johnston, American Democratic politician

See also
Elizabeth Johnson (disambiguation)